Cascade Investment, L.L.C. is an American holding company and private investment firm headquartered in Kirkland, Washington, United States.  It is controlled by Bill Gates, and managed by Michael Larson. More than half of Gates's fortune is held in assets outside his holding of Microsoft shares. Cascade is the successor company to Dominion Income Management, the former investment vehicle for Gates's holdings, which was managed by convicted felon  Andrew Evans.

Larson reportedly directs Cascade's investments through Bill and Melinda Gates Investments, a firm that also manages the portfolios of the Bill and Melinda Gates Foundation and other connected entities. Larson accrued over the twenty years from 1995 an 11% compound annual return, and as of 2014 had 100 employees working under his direction. In 2021, Cascade drew attention due to allegations of toxic work environment caused by Larson.

With 269,000 acres of farmland (which has been historically countercyclical to the stock market) being held through a wide network of shell companies, Cascade Investment is the largest farmland owner in the United States.

Cascade has managed Gates' stake in Canadian National Railway since 2013. This constituted one of the investment firm's largest holdings. In 2022, the company sold $940 million worth of stocks, whittling Gates' stake down to 1.4 percent.

Notable investments

References

External links

Investment companies of the United States
Bill Gates
Conglomerate companies of the United States
Holding companies of the United States
Companies based in Kirkland, Washington
American companies established in 1995
Financial services companies established in 1995
Holding companies established in 1995
1995 establishments in Washington (state)
Privately held companies based in Washington (state)